Football Club Aktobe, commonly referred to as FC Aktobe or simply Aktobe, is a professional football club based in Aktobe. They last played in the Kazakhstan Premier League, the highest level of Kazakh football. Formed as Aktyubinets in 1967, they became Aktobemunai in 1996, Aktobe in 1997, Aktobe-Lento in 2000 and finally Aktobe again in 2005. Their home ground is the 13,500 seat Central Stadium.

Aktobe have won five league titles, one Kazakhstan Cup and three Kazakhstan Super Cup. The club has also won two Soviet Second League titles in 1981 and 1991.

History 

Aktobe was founded in 1967 as Aktyubinets. They played their first three seasons in the Class B Division, fourth tier of the Soviet League system. For the next 7 seasons, they were not active in official tournaments. In 1976, the club joined the Soviet Second League, to play in its Zone 7, and in 1981, they won the championship . In 1990, the team recorded a 10–0 victory over Bulat, which remains the club's biggest victory on record. In the 1991 season, the last year of Soviet League existence, the club won Zone 8 Championship.

Following the dissolution of the Soviet Union, the club joined the newly formed Kazakhstan Premier League. In 1994, Aktyubinets reached Kazakhstan Cup final, which they lost to Vostok with a score of 0–1. In 1996, the club changed name to Aktobemunai. However, after one season they renamed again to Aktobe. As the result of reduction of league teams in 1997, Aktobe was relegated to the Kazakhstan First Division. In the 2000 season, the club won Kazakhstan First Division and were promoted to the Kazakhstan Premier League.

On 20 July 2015, Ioan Andone was appointed as the club's manager. After finishing Third in the league, on 10 November 2015, Andone left the club after his contract wasn't extended.
On 22 December 2015, Yuri Utkulbayev was announced as Aktobe new manager. Ihor Rakhayev replaced Utkulbayev prior to the start of the 2017 season.

Domestic history

European history

Notes
 1Q: First qualifying round
 2Q: Second qualifying round
 3Q: Third qualifying round
 PO: Play-off round
 GS: Group stage

The following list ranks the current position of Aktobe in UEFA club ranking:

As of 1 June 2018.

Colours and crest 
In March 2016, Aktobe announced Lotto as their new kit suppliers.

Honours 
Source:

Kazakhstan Premier League
Champions (5): 2005, 2007, 2008, 2009, 2013
Kazakhstan Cup
Champions: 2008
Kazakhstan Super Cup
Champions (3): 2008, 2010, 2014

Current squad

Managerial history 

  Vladimir Nikitenko (1 Jan 1994 – 31 Dec 1994)
  Vakhid Masudov (2003)
  Oleksandr Ishchenko (2003–04)
  Vladimir Mukhanov (1 July 2006 – 31 Dec 2012)
  Vladimir Nikitenko (1 Jan 2013 – 8 July 2014)
  Vladimir Gazzayev (10 July 2014 – 16 July 2015)
  Ioan Andone (20 July 2015 – 10 November 2015)
  Yuri Utkulbayev (22 December 2015 – December 2016)
  Ihor Rakhayev (December 2016 – May 2017)
  Vladimir Mukhanov (May 2017 – December 2018)
  Aleksandr Sednyov (January 2019 – December 2019)
  Vladimir Maminov (January – February 2020)
  Aleksei Petrushin (February – September 2020)
  Vladimir Zelenovskiy (October – December 2020)
  Alyaksey Baha (January 2021 – 5 May 2021)
  Vladimir Zelenovskiy  (5 May 2021 – 7 June 2021)
  Vakhid Masudov (7 June 2021 – 26 July 2021)
  Mukhtar Erimbetov  (26 July 2021 – 4 August 2021)
  Vladimir Mukhanov (4 August 2021 – 28 April 2022)
  Petr Badlo  (28 April 2022 – 6 May 2022)
  Andrei Karpovich (6 May 2022 – Present)

References

External links 

  
 FC Aktobe at UEFA.com

 
1967 establishments in the Kazakh Soviet Socialist Republic
Aktobe, FC
Aktobe, FC
Aktobe Region